Nipponocypris is a genus of cyprinid fish containing three extant species, one endemic to Japan, one to South Korea while the third occurs in Japan, Korea and China.  A fourth, extinct species is known from Middle Pleistocene-aged freshwater strata from the Kusu Basin in Japan.

Species
 Nipponocypris koreanus (I. S. Kim, M. K. Oh & K. Hosoya, 2005)
 Nipponocypris sieboldii (Temminck & Schlegel, 1846)
 Nipponocypris temminckii (Temminck & Schlegel, 1846)

References
 

Cyprinid fish of Asia
Cyprinidae genera